Neema Iyer is a technologist and artist. She is the founder and director of Pollicy, a civic technology organization based in Kampala, Uganda.

Early life and education
Iyer was raised in Nigeria by parents who are Tanzanian and Indian. She then attended Emory University and completed a Masters in Public Health with a focus on epidemiology and statistics before returning to Africa.

Career
After Iyer moved to Uganda in 2013, she worked in information and communications technology, and then founded the civic technology organization Pollicy with grant funding from Facebook and Mozilla. In 2014, she was the Text to Change programme coordinator in Uganda, which included work on a program to improve access to clean water.

Pollicy and Iyer have conducted research, including about gender-based violence in Africa, and online safety for women, with reports illustrated by Iyer. In 2020, after Iyer submitted the concept idea to the Mozilla Creative Awards, Pollicy partnered with Mozilla to create the "Choose Your Own Fake News" game, which her team spent months developing. Iyer drew the characters for the game, and emphasized in her designs the target audience of Africans. Other Pollicy projects include a mockumentary about digital security developed with support from the University of California, Berkeley Center for Long-term Cybersecurity, and a "Digital safe-tea" game designed with a "choose your own adventure" format to promote online safety awareness for women in Africa.

In July 2021, Iyer was appointed to the Global Women's Safety Advisory Board at Facebook. In 2022, Iyer and Pollicy announced a Digital Ambassadors program to promote the development of skills and access of young women in Africa to online technology.

Honors and awards
 2021 Quartz Africa Innovator
 2021 Digital Equality Award, Research and Knowledge Builder category, Coalition for Digital Equality (CODE)
 2021-22 Digital Civil Society Lab (DCSL) Practitioner Fellow, Stanford University

References

External links
 
 Pollicy.org
 What does the future of feminist AI look like? (Neema Iyer, Goethe-Institut)

Living people
Ugandan  artists
Feminist artists
Emory University alumni
21st-century Ugandan businesswomen
21st-century Ugandan businesspeople
Year of birth missing (living people)